William Maxwell was a clergyman, member of the landed gentry and noted companion to Dr Johnson.

Maxwell was born 24 August 1732, in Donagh, County Monaghan, Ireland, the son of John Maxwell and Isabella Leavens of Falkland Castle.

Education and Family
He was educated at Trinity College Dublin which he entered on 3 November 1747, graduating B.A. in 1762, M.A. in 1755, and D.D. in 1777.

Maxwell married Anne Massingberd on 6 December 1777 in South Ormsby, Lincolnshire, England. They had four children two of whom survived into adulthood. Including Anne Maxwell who married Henry Francis Lyte and were the parents of Farnham Maxwell-Lyte and grandfather of Sir Henry Churchill Maxwell-Lyte.

Maxwell became acquainted with Dr Samuel Johnson; the two quickly became good friends and Maxwell compiled many Johnsonianisms, which were entered into Boswell's work as Collecteanea and which represent a significant contribution to Johnsonian scholarship.

Death
Maxwell left his family seat Falkland Castle after being shot at by rebels and moved to Bath. He died there on 3 September 1818, at Bennett Street, Bath.

References 

1732 births
1818 deaths